

The Dassault-Sagem SlowFast is a tactical stealth UAV concept designed by the French unmanned aircraft manufacturer Dassault-Sagem Tactical UAV in 2004. The program was cancelled.

The SlowFast is an evolution of the twin-engine tactical UAV Dassault AVE-C Moyen Duc. The SlowFast designation comes from its versatility to perform high-speed reconnaissance flight (Mach 1.6) and 3–4 hours autonomy low-speed (120 kt) observation mission. Its ground station is based on the Sagem Sperwer's model. The drone was designed for the French Army's needs and was planned to be used by the Ground Force divisions.

Specifications (as designed)

See also
 Dassault AVE-C Moyen Duc

References
 International Online Defense Magazine, Year 2005, Issue #2

2000s French military reconnaissance aircraft
Proposed military equipment
Unmanned military aircraft of France
Unmanned stealth aircraft
Proposed aircraft of France
Dassault Group aircraft
SAGEM aircraft